The 2004 DFB-Ligapokal was the eighth edition of the DFB-Ligapokal. Bayern Munich won their fifth title, beating Werder Bremen 3–2 in the final.

Participating clubs
A total of six teams qualified for the competition. The labels in the parentheses show how each team qualified for the place of its starting round:
1st, 2nd, 3rd, 4th, etc.: League position
CW: Cup winners

Notes

Matches

Preliminary round

Semi-finals

Final

References

DFL-Ligapokal seasons
Ligapokal